Jieyang Airport railway station, formerly known as Chaoshan Airport railway station during construction, is a railway station in Jiedong District, Jieyang, Guangdong, China. It serves Jieyang Chaoshan International Airport.

History
The station was opened on 11 October 2019 with the Meizhou–Chaoshan railway.

References

Railway stations in Guangdong
Railway stations opened in 2019
Airport railway stations in China